Mandopop singer Zhou Shen's representative song, "Big Fish", won eight awards for him. According to charts statistics of Netease Cloud Music as of July 1, 2020, Zhou Shen was praised as "one of the most successful renowned Chinese artists in recent years" by Netease Cloud Music.

Studio albums

EP

Cover albums

Live albums

Singles

OST

Collaborative songs

Other live performing songs 
Songs below are mostly adapted songs which Zhou performed in TV shows or live show.

References

Zhou Shen
Pop music discographies
Discographies of Chinese artists
Mandopop discographies